The Grocer's Wife is a 1991 Canadian drama film written, produced and directed by John Pozer. It won the inaugural Claude Jutra Award for best feature film by a first-time director.

Synopsis
Set in Trail, British Columbia, the film stars Simon Webb as Tim Midley, an emissions inspector at the local smokestack who lives with his domineering mother Mildred (Andrea Rankin). When his mother falls ill, he invites stripper Anita Newlove (Susinn McFarlen) to move in with him, while simultaneously fending off the advances of Mrs. Friendly (Nicola Cavendish), the wife of the neighbourhood grocer.

The film was also noted for giving rise to the "West Coast Wave" of Canadian filmmakers in the 1990s; several film students who would later go on to become prominent in Canadian cinema, including directors Lynne Stopkewich, Mina Shum and Bruce Sweeney, editor and director Reginald Harkema and cinematographer Greg Middleton, worked on The Grocer's Wife as one of their first filmmaking jobs.

Awards
The film premiered at the 1991 Toronto International Film Festival, where it received an honorable mention from the Best Canadian Film jury. Although an honorable mention comes with no financial recompense, Atom Egoyan, who had won the award for The Adjuster, declined his $25,000 winner's cheque and instead gave it to Pozer.

Cavendish won the Genie Award for Best Supporting Actress at the 14th Genie Awards. At the same ceremony, Pozer won the Claude Jutra Award, and Mark Korven was nominated for Best Original Score.

Cast
 Simon Webb as Tim Midley
 Susinn McFarlen as Anita Newlove
 Nicola Cavendish as Mrs. Friendly
 Jay Brazeau as Barber
 Andrea Rankin as Mildred Midley
 Alec Burden as Hermann Melzer
 LeRoy Schulz as Mr. Friendly
 Walter Mills as Minister

References

External links

1991 films
1991 directorial debut films
1991 drama films
1990s Canadian films
1990s English-language films
Canadian drama films
English-language Canadian films
Best First Feature Genie and Canadian Screen Award-winning films
Films directed by John Pozer
Films scored by Mark Korven
Films set in British Columbia
Trail, British Columbia